Taşlık (Turkish taş for "stone" followed by the noun forming suffix "-lık" with the meaning "-ness", thus approximately "stoniness" or "stony place") may refer to the following settlements in Turkey:

 Taşlık, Cumayeri
 Taşlık, Gölyaka
 Taşlık, Karacabey
 Taşlık, Kastamonu,  village in the District of Kastamonu, Kastamonu Province, Turkey
 Taşlık, Kozluk, a village in the District of Kozluk, Batman Province, Turkey
 Taşlık, Kıbrıscık,  a village in the District of Kıbrısçık, Bolu Province, Turkey